Joliet Correctional Center (originally known as Illinois State Penitentiary, colloquially as Joliet Prison, Joliet Penitentiary, the Old Joliet Prison, and the Collins Street Prison) was a prison in Joliet, Illinois, United States, from 1858 to 2002. It is featured in the motion picture The Blues Brothers as the prison from which Jake Blues is released at the beginning of the movie (hence his nickname Joliet Jake). It is also used for the exterior shots of the Illinois "state prison" in the James Cagney film White Heat, and the location for first season of Fox Network's Prison Break television show, and the movie Let's Go to Prison.  In 2018, it opened for tours.

History

Joliet Correctional Center, which was a completely separate prison from Stateville Correctional Center in nearby Crest Hill, opened in 1858. The prison was built with convict labor leased by the state to contractor Lorenzo P. Sanger and warden Samuel K. Casey. The limestone used to build the prison was quarried on the site. The first 33 inmates arrived from Alton in May 1858 to begin construction; the last prisoners were transferred in July 1860. Both criminals and prisoners of war were confined there during the Civil War. The first corrections officer to be killed there was Joseph Clark in 1865. By 1872 the population had reached 1,239, a record number for a single prison. From the 1870s the prison had work contracts with local businesses.

The penitentiary's original plans included a one-hundred cell "Female Cell House" located inside the male penitentiary. Female prisoners were housed adjacent to men's cells from 1859 until 1870, when they were moved to the fourth floor of the central administration building. In 1896 a separate, one-hundred cellblock "Joliet Women's Prison" was built across the street from the male penitentiary. In design it was an exact mini-replica of the male prison. In 1933 all female prisoners were moved to the Oakdale Women's Reformatory (later known as Dwight Correctional Center) and the facility was used for male prisoners.The women's prison was converted into secondary facility to house male prisoners, making Joliet Prison an all-male prison.

The prison was slow to modernize. There was no running water or toilets in the cells in 1910. The construction of the nearby Stateville Correctional Center began in 1917 and opened in March 1925 was meant to lead to the swift closure of Joliet. This did not happen, and both prisons operated simultaneously for the rest of the 20th Century.

In 1924, Nathan Leopold and Richard Loeb were given life sentences to be served at Joliet (after their successful defense—from the death penalty—by Clarence Darrow). Their case was known as "the crime of the century" at the time after kidnapping and murdering Robert Franks. The duo went on to revamp the prison's educational system, adding a high school curriculum to help inmates who are seeking for a tertiary education.

In 1933 Lester Joseph Gillis (Baby Face Nelson) was released from Joliet Prison, and a mock-up of the foyer is shown in the 1957 movie, "Baby Face Nelson" where Gillis (played by Mickey Rooney) is seen both entering and leaving the facility with a suitcase in his hand. The name of the prison can be seen in his exit sequence.

From at least the early 1960s, the prison included a reception and classification center for northern Illinois, holding new prisoners for less than a month before their final assignments and processing over 20,000 a year. In addition to the prisoners temporarily held in the R&C unit, Joliet maintained a large population of permanent inmates.

In the late 1960's quasi-ethical hepatitis experiments at Willowbrook State School on developmentally disabled children became controversial. When these were discontinued, the US Army recruited "volunteers" at Joliet to continue the experiments. In reality, the "volunteers" were Vietnam-draft conscientious objectors, who agreed to drink feces-laden chocolate milkshakes and exposed to the feces of other inmates in an effort to mass-produce and isolate the virus that caused Hepatitis A. The Army was especially interested in Hepatitis A because it was a classic disease of overcrowding and unsanitary conditions common in prisons and military camps.

In 1975, members of the Almighty Black P. Stone Nation and other Chicago street gangs took over a cell block and held several corrections officers hostage. The warden at the time, Fred L. Finkbeiner, spoke to the inmates through a bullhorn and promised they would not be harmed. Their primary grievance was the fact that they were being transferred to other prisons because they had too much control over other inmates at Joliet. One former gang member, Herbert "Cadillac" Catlett, had reformed and been cooperating with the administration to bring about positive change. He tried to reason with the rioting inmates and was murdered. Warden Finkbeiner was standing in Catlett's blood as he spoke to the inmates, and the hostage situation was resolved. The warden later eulogized Catlett at an African-American church in Chicago Heights.

The number of inmates peaked at 1,300 in 1990 and was still 1,156 in 2000, although capacity had been raised to 1,300 over 1999–2000, from 1,180 previously. In 2000 there were 541 staff.

Closure
Joliet Correctional Center closed as a holding prison in 2002. Budget cuts and the obsolete and dangerous nature of the buildings were the cited reasons. All inmates and most staff were transferred to Stateville Correctional Center.

 the Joliet Area Historical Museum is running tours of the penitentiary for Route 66 travelers and other interested parties. Different tours are being offered: History, photography/tripod friendly and private tours.

On May 30, 2017, one of the buildings (the mattress factory) in Joliet Correctional Center was heavily damaged by fire, the cause of which was later determined to be arson. This is the third building to be severely damaged or destroyed by fire at the facility.

Media

Poetry
Joliet is referred to in Edgar Lee Masters's poem "Silas Dement", part of the Spoon River Anthology:
When I came back from Joliet
There was a new court house with a dome.
For I was punished like all who destroy
The past for the sake of the future.

Fiction
In the Commitment Arc of The Adventure Zone one of the characters suggests "going to Joliet".

Mentioned in Kerouac's On the Road: "To get out of the impossible complexities of Chicago traffic I took a bus to Joliet, Illinois, went by the Joliet pen, stationed myself just outside town after a walk through its leafy rickety streets behind, and pointed my way."

Non Fiction
In chapter 31 of The Case of the Murderous Dr. Cream by Dean Jobb, in reference to inmate Thomas Neill Cream, admitted November 1881.

Music
Memphis Minnie recorded the song "Joliet Bound" with Kansas Joe McCoy in 1932, which was most likely derived from the same source as Noah Lee's "Viola Lee Blues". Perhaps the most well-known version of the tune was by Rory Block on When a Woman Gets the Blues.

Bob Dylan's "Percy's Song" tells the story of the singer's attempt to have a friend's ninety-nine year sentence in Joliet Prison commuted. The song, an outtake from the sessions that produced Dylan's album The Times They Are a-Changin', has been covered by Fairport Convention and Arlo Guthrie.

The Henningsens wrote and recorded the song "Gun", which mentions Joliet – "I'm singing solo in my cell in Joliet".

Folk singer Steve Goodman recorded the song "Lincoln Park Pirates" concerning an auto towing company of Chicago. The song includes the lyrics "Our drivers are friendly and courteous/ Their good manners you always will get/ 'Cause they all are recent graduates/ Of the charm school in Joliet".

Television and film
Joliet Prison was featured in the 1980 John Landis film The Blues Brothers both as a filming location and as the namesake for "Joliet" Jake Blues (John Belushi).

 1949 -- White Heat (exteriors) 
1966 – Get Smart, season 2 episode 14 ("The Whole Tooth and..."). As part of a mission, secret agent Maxwell Smart (Don Adams) deliberately gets himself arrested and sent to the prison so he can make contact with an inmate there.
 1973 – Charley Varrick, When Tom (from Tom's Gun Shop) asks where he is supposed to know Al Dutcher from, Charley (Walter Matthau) replies, "From Joliet. He was doing a 10-year slide for murder two. His girlfriend. Armenian girl."
 1980 – The Blues Brothers, In the opening of the 1980 movie: Elwood Blues (Dan Aykroyd) is seen picking up Jake Blues (John Belushi) upon his release from Joliet prison.
 1981 – Thief, James Caan's character tells Tuesday Weld's that he spent eleven years in Joliet.
 1986 - Running Scared, It is mentioned crime boss Julio Gonzales was released from Joliet.
 1988 – Red Heat, a 1988 film which starred Arnold Schwarzenegger and James Belushi
 1994 – Saturday Night Live, a skit concerning prison life with Chris Farley and Martin Lawrence.
 1999 – the Columbia TriStar show Early Edition, season 3 episode 13 ("The Last Untouchable").  Fictional mobster Antonio Birelli played by Ernest Borgnine is released from the prison.

Since its closure, Joliet Prison has been used much more as a set for various film and television projects.
 2005 - Some characters from Saw II were ex-Joliet Prison inmates.
 2005 – Derailed, a 2005 film which starred Clive Owen and Jennifer Aniston
 2005–06 – the Fox Network shot the first season of its show Prison Break on location in the old facility. This prison was known as Fox River State Penitentiary on the show
 2006 – Let's Go to Prison, a 2006 film which starred Dax Shepard and Will Arnett.
 2007 – the Fox Network show Bones, season 2 episode 12 ("The man in the cell"). The prison where serial killer Howard Epps was held was known as 'Bay View Federal Penitentiary' on the show
 2009 – Warehouse 13: Season 1, Episode 9 – A brief, exterior video shot of Joliet Prison's administrative building is shown to represent the fictional "Riverton Penitentiary" in Florida, where the plot of this episode takes place.  From Amazon Prime Video's episode synopsis:       "When Artie (Saul Rubinek) receives word of a rash of unexplained suicides at a Florida prison, Pete (Eddie McClintock) and Myka (Joanne Kelly) are sent to investigate..."    An IMDB synopsis reads:   "A prison, a new warden, and a charismatic preacher inmate who may have an artifact that seems related to a string of prisoner suicides accompanied by hallucinations. Pete and Myka search for the artifact as an approaching tropical storm accentuates its influence, but get caught up in the mayhem".
 2011 – Breakout Kings on A&E featured T-Bag from Prison Break escaping from Fox River, again.
 2015 – Briefly featured in Flash season 2 "family of rogues" as Iron Heights prison.
 2017 – Features in Season 1 Episode 9 of Netflix's Mindhunter as it held the serial killer Richard Speck.  The actual prison itself was not featured in the filming of the episode, however.
 2019 – Old Joliet Prison was featured as a haunted location in an episode of Ghost Adventures titled "Serial Killer Spirits: John Gacy Prison".
 The Travel Channel's television show Destination Fear filmed at the location for the tenth episode of their second season.

See also

 List of Illinois state prisons
 Fox River State Penitentiary

References

External links 

 "Joliet Correctional Center" Illinois Department of Corrections (Archive)
 Joliet Prison at Google Maps
  Information on Joliet Prison at the bottom of the page.

1858 establishments in Illinois
2002 disestablishments in Illinois
Defunct prisons in Illinois
Landmarks in Illinois
Buildings and structures in Joliet, Illinois